Belfast Victoria was a constituency of the Parliament of Northern Ireland.

Boundaries
Belfast Victoria was a borough constituency comprising part of eastern Belfast. It was created in 1929, when the House of Commons (Method of Voting and Redistribution of Seats) Act (Northern Ireland) 1929 introduced first-past-the-post elections throughout Northern Ireland.

Belfast Victoria was created by the division of Belfast East into four new constituencies. It survived unchanged, returning one member of Parliament, until the Parliament of Northern Ireland was temporarily suspended in 1972, and then formally abolished in 1973.

The seat contained the eastern parts of the former Victoria ward. It covered an area equivalent to the current wards of Sydenham, Belmont and Ballyhackamore together with parts of the Island and Stormont wards.

Politics
The seat was held in the early years by Ulster Unionist Party candidates. However, there was always strong support for labour movement candidates, with David Bleakley holding the seat for seven years.

Members of Parliament

†Bradford was elected in 1969 as an "O'Neill Unionist" supporting the reform proposals of the then Prime Minister.

Election results

References

Northern Ireland Parliament constituencies established in 1929
Victoria
Northern Ireland Parliament constituencies disestablished in 1973